Makhdoom Yahiya Maneri was an Indian Sufi saint of the 13th century. His tomb in courtyard of a mosque, located in Maner, 29 km from Patna, Bihar, India.

Biography
His complete name is Kamaaluddin Yahya Maneri. He was son of Makhdoom Israil son of Imam Mohammad Taj Faquih Hashmi (also called Sheikh Al Hind). His family settled in Maner which was later also called Maner Sharif. He studied Islamic law at Al-Nizamiyya of Baghdad Academy. He was a disciple of Sheikh Shahab al-Din Abu Hafs Umar al-Suhrawardi of Suhrawardiyya Sufi order. His associates include Baha-ud-din Zakariya Multani, Shaykh Saadi Shirazi and Kamal al-Din Isma'il al-'Isfahani and Makhdoom Shahabuddin Pir Jagjot of Balkh who settled in Jaitley near Patna.

He married one of the daughters of his friend Makhdoom Shahabuddin Pir Jagjot and had four sons and at least one daughter with her.

The sacred shrine is locally known as Bari (meaning big) Dargah, while the mausoleum of his descendant, Makhdoom Shah Daulat is known as Chhoti (small) Dargah.

This  shrine has remained a place of pilgrimage for a long time. Notable visitors include Sikandar Lodi and the Mughal emperor Babar (1520–1530).

His son Makhdoom Sharfuddin Ahmed Yahya Maneri's books Maktoobate sadi (hundred letters of century) and Maktoobate do sadi (two hundred letters of second century) are renowned Persian language collections of spiritual writings. The Persian books on Islamic Theosophy titled Maktoobate sadi (hundred letters ) and Maktoobate do sadi (two hundred letters ) were written by his son Sheikh Sharfuddin Ahmed Maneri. The original manuscripts are available in the collection of Khuda Bakhsh Oriental Library at Patna, Bihar India

Among his descendants, Makhdoom Shah Daulat died in 1608. His mausoleum Chhoti Dargah was built by Ibrahim Khan Kankar, Governor of Bihar, and completed in 1616. It is still known as an excellent example of Mughal architecture. Like several other shrines of Sufi saints, Hazarat Makhdoom Yahya Maneri is revered both by Muslims as well as by Hindus.

Further reading 
 Encyclopaedia of Sufism (12 volumes edited by Masood Ali Khan and S. Ram) 
 The Life and Teaching of Sufi Saint Hazrat Shaikh Sharafuddin Ahmad Yahya Maneri (Rah A) by Syed Sadrul Hasan (Bazm-I- Firdausia Trust, Karachi)

See also 
 Makhdoom
 Makhdoom Sharfuddin Ahmed Yahya Maneri

References

External links
Government of Bihar
Dargah Maner Sharif

Indian Sufis
People from Patna district
13th-century Indian philosophers
Scholars from Bihar